Senator Walker may refer to:

Members of the United States Senate
Freeman Walker (1780–1827), U.S. Senator from Georgia from 1819 to 1821
George Walker (Kentucky politician) (1763–1819), U.S. Senator from Kentucky from 1814 to 1815
Isaac P. Walker (1815–1872), U.S. Senator from Wisconsin from 1848 to 1855
James D. Walker (1830–1906), U.S. Senator from Arkansas from 1879 to 1885
John Walker (Virginia politician) (1744–1809), U.S. Senator from Virginia in 1790
John Williams Walker (1783–1823), U.S. Senator from Alabama from 1819 to 1822
Robert J. Walker (1801–1869), U.S. Senator from Mississippi from 1835 to 1845
Walter Walker (politician) (1883–1956), U.S. Senator from Colorado in 1932

United States state senate members
Amasa Walker (1799–1875), Massachusetts State Senate
C. Harding Walker (1859–1934), Virginia State Senate
Carlene M. Walker (born 1947), Utah State Senate
Charles E. Walker (1860–1893), New York State Senate
Charles Walker (Georgia politician) (born 1947), Georgia State Senate
David S. Walker (1815–1891), Florida State Senate
Edward C. Walker (New York politician) (1837–1903), New York State Senate
Edward Walker (politician) (born 1969), Montana State Senate
Greg Walker (politician) (born 1963), Indiana State Senate
Howard Walker (politician) (born 1954), Michigan State Senate
Jack E. Walker (1900–1979), Illinois State Senate
Jimmy Walker (1881–1946), New York State Senate
John A. Walker (Iowa politician) (1912–2012), Iowa State Senate
John Walker (Missouri politician) (1770–1838), Missouri State Senate
Joseph Knox Walker (died 1863), Tennessee State Senate
Lyman Walker (1799–1886), Wisconsin State Senate
Moses B. Walker (1819–1895), Ohio State Senate
Norman R. Walker (1889–1949), Alaska Territorial Senate
Samuel Walker (soldier) (1822–1893), Kansas State Senate
Stanley C. Walker (1923–2001), Virginia State Senate
Vicki Walker (born 1956), Oregon State Senate
William H. Walker (Vermont judge) (1832–1896), Vermont State Senate